Marcus Haley (born Marcus Haley October 5, 1972 in Las Vegas, Nevada, U.S.) is an IFBB  American bodybuilder. He most referred as Haley's Comet. Before touching weights, Marcus was taking care of his four little brothers while his mother was fighting a bout of drug abuse. An outstanding running back and defensive back at Pahrump High School, he earned a scholarship to Dakota Wesleyan University. He attended Dakota Wesleyan University for two years, but after encountering a lot a racism he returned home. Haley admits that he always looked up to Shawn Ray and Mike Ashley as a youth.  While in Las Vegas, Haley started training at Golds gym and met a female bodybuilder named Gabby.  His first show was the Golds Gym Classic in Las Vegas. Not knowing how to diet, he ate hamburger patties from McDonald's. Carb loading was done with rice and French fries. He placed third in the show.

He earned his IFBB pro card by placing 1st in the Super Heavyweight division in the 2005 USA Bodybuilding/Figure Championships. He was outdone by Phil Heath, who won the overall in that show.

In 2007, he entered the Ironman Pro and placed 5th, which gives him is first bid at the 2007 Mr. Olympia.

As well as his 2007 Arnold Classic placing, Haley won the "Best Poser" award.

Haley currently resides in Peoria, Arizona, where he runs a contest prep / lifestyle fitness group called Team Comet Fitness. #teamcomet

Vital statistics
Height: 5'9

Contest weight: 245 lb

Off-season weight: 265 lb

Arms: 22in.

Chest: 52in.

Waist: 32in.

Thighs: 30in.

Calves:22in.

Bodybuilding Placings
 2010 Mr. Olympia - 13th
 2010 Orlando Pro - 2nd
 2009 Ironman - 9th
 2008 Injured - Torn Quad Tendon
 2007 Olympia - 16th
 2007 Arnold Classic - 12th
 2007 Sacramento Pro - 5th
 2007 Ironman Pro - 5th (**Qualified for Mr. Olympia)
 2006 Europa Super Show - 8th
 2006 Atlantic City Pro - 4th
 2006 Colorado Pro - 4th
 2005 Mr. North America - 1st and Overall
 2005 USA Bodybuilding/Figure Championships - 1st (Super Heavyweight)
 2004 USA Bodybuilding/Figure Championships - 3rd (Super Heavyweight)
 2003 National Bodybuilding/Figure Championships - 7th (Heavyweight)
 2002 USA Bodybuilding/Figure Championships - 2nd (Heavyweight)
 2001 USA Bodybuilding/Figure Championships - 3rd (Heavyweight)
 1999 NPC National Championships - (PLACE UNKNOWN)
 1999 Las Vegas Classic - 2nd
 1998 NPC National Championships - (PLACE UNKNOWN)
 1997 Golds Gym Classic - 3rd (Middleweight)

DVDs 
 Quest for the Comet

See also
List of male professional bodybuilders
List of female professional bodybuilders
Mr. Olympia
Arnold Classic

References

External links 
 MarcusHaley.com - official site
  - Quest for the Comet DVD
  - Team BodyTech Star Profile
 Marcus Haley Profile - Profile at Sportnutrition.com

American bodybuilders
1972 births
Living people
African-American bodybuilders
Professional bodybuilders
Dakota Wesleyan University alumni
21st-century African-American sportspeople
20th-century African-American sportspeople